Jan Vermeer van Haarlem, or Jan van der Meer II (1656 – May 28, 1705) was a Dutch Golden Age painter from Haarlem. A landscape painter primarily, he was baptized there on November 29, 1656.

Biography
According to the RKD he was taught by his father, the landscape painter Jan Vermeer van Haarlem the Elder and became a follower of Nicolaes Berchem. He was the brother of the painters Isaac and Barend, and married the sister of Cornelis Dusart. He seems to have spent some time in Amsterdam but was back in Haarlem in 1681-1683 where he married and joined the Haarlem Guild of St. Luke. He is known for italianate landscapes in the manner of his father and Berchem, and signed his works "J v der meer de jonge" (Jan van der Meer the Younger).

References

Jan van der Meer on Artnet
Jan Vermeer van Haarlem III on Artnet

1656 births
1705 deaths
Dutch Golden Age painters
Dutch male painters
Dutch landscape painters
Artists from Haarlem
Painters from Haarlem